Hartlepool nuclear power station is a nuclear power station situated on the northern bank of the mouth of the River Tees,  south of Hartlepool in County Durham, North East England.
The station has a net electrical output of 1,185megawatts, which is 2% of Great Britain's peak electricity demand of 60GW.
Electricity is produced through the use of two advanced gas-cooled reactors (AGR). Hartlepool was only the third nuclear power station in the United Kingdom to use AGR technology.  It was also the first nuclear power station to be built close to a major urban area.

Originally planned in 1967, with construction starting in 1969, the station started generating electricity in 1983, and was completed in 1985, initially being operated by the Central Electricity Generating Board. With privatisation of the UK's electric supply industry in 1990, the station has been owned by Nuclear Electric and British Energy, but is now owned and operated by EDF Energy. On 18 October 2010 the British government announced that Hartlepool was one of the eight sites it considered suitable for future nuclear power stations.

The power station will cease power generation in March 2026, prior to defueling and decommissioning.

History
After building the first operational advanced gas-cooled reactor (AGR) nuclear power station at Dungeness, the Central Electricity Generating Board (CEGB) proposed their third AGR station in 1967 to be situated on the edge of the Durham coalfield, near the seaside resort of Seaton Carew. The proposal came at a time when the CEGB's move toward  fuels alternative to coal threatened the coal industry's existence. Despite this, and a short ministerial delay, the plans for the Seaton Carew station (which became known as Hartlepool nuclear power station) went ahead. Because the construction of the station was given the go ahead, the National Coal Board were not able to get the CEGB behind the plans for a prototype fluidised bed combustion (FBC) coal station at Grimethorpe in Yorkshire. Because of this, the UK did not build FBC technology.

Sited  from Seaton Carew, and in the middle of the industrial complex of Teesside, the station was to be built closer to any major urban area than any nuclear power station site had been. To make this acceptable, the station's reactors were to be housed in prestressed concrete pressure vessels.

The construction of the power station which was undertaken by Nuclear Design & Construction ('NDC'), a consortium backed by English Electric, Babcock International Group and Taylor Woodrow Construction,
began in 1969.

The construction was delayed in 1970, when the Nuclear Installations Inspectorate declared that they were unhappy with part of the station's boiler design, setting the CEGB back £25million. The station's reactors were supplied by the National Nuclear Corporation, and the station's generating sets by the General Electric Company.
Some fourteen years into construction, the first of the station's two units were commissioned in 1983, the other in 1985.
The station first generated electricity commercially on 1 August 1983.

Nuclear fuel for Hartlepool power station is delivered and removed via a loading/unloading facility on a 1½ mile branch from the Durham Coast Line.

Visitor centre
In the 1980s, there was an interactive visitor centre on site. There was also an activity centre for school visits which hosted a number of special events. Tours of the power station itself also took place. The centre was closed after privatisation in the 1990s, but a new visitor centre was opened by current operators EDF Energy in 2013.

This centre also hosts 'Crucial Crew' events for school pupils in the local areas. These experiences teach children about health and safety.

2013 turbine fire
At 19:18 on 20 April 2013 a small fire broke out in the turbine hall of unit 2 at the power station while Reactor 2 was being brought back into service. The fire was caused by an oil leak, and ignited lagging surrounding part of the turbine. Reactor 2 was shut down and cooled, mitigating any threat of nuclear contamination. Emergency services attended the fire from stations across the Cleveland area and the fire was extinguished at 19:53. During the incident, fire cover in the Cleveland area was provided by units from Darlington and County Durham.

Specification
The station is of the advanced gas-cooled reactor (AGR) type. It provides electricity for over 3% of the UK using two 1,575MWth advanced gas-cooled reactors to power two generators (590 MWe + 595 MWe), giving a maximum generating capacity of 1,320MW. The station's designed net electrical output is 1,185MW. This is enough electricity to power 1.5million homes. There are four 17.5MW auxiliary gas turbines on the site, these had first been commissioned in October 1973.

Future of the station 
The power station was originally expected to shut down in 2009, but was given permission by the Nuclear Installations Inspectorate (NII) for an extension of five years in 2007, meaning that it could continue to generate until 2014.
In 2010, the lifetime was further extended by another five years, so that generation can continue until 2019.
The company then began work to extend station lifetime to 2024 and beyond, and an announcement was made in November 2013 that the plant would have a further extension to its operating life of 5 years taking the expected decommissioning date to 2024. 
The 2024 closure was reaffirmed in 2022.
An announcement was made in March 2023 that the plant would have an additional extension to its life of 2 years. Taking the expected decommissioning date to March 2026.

Closing the station would reduce the available reactive power in the local grid by 200 MVAr.

New station 
In July 2008, the plant's then-operator British Energy, suggested that the site would be a good location for a replacement nuclear power station.
Then a year later in July 2009, the UK government named Hartlepool on a list of eleven sites in England and Wales, where new nuclear power stations could be built. On 9 November 2009, the government announced that ten of these sites, including Hartlepool, had been given the go-ahead for the construction of new reactors.
If built, the station would use reactors capable of generating 1,800MW each. It would cost between £5billion and £6billion to construct, would employ up to 3,000 construction workers for the possible eight-year construction period, as well as providing 600 full-time jobs once completed. The new station has an anticipated operating life of 60 years.

The plans are opposed by environmental groups such as Friends of the Earth and Stop New Nuclear.

See also

Nuclear power in the United Kingdom
Energy policy of the United Kingdom
Energy use and conservation in the United Kingdom

References

External links

 Hartlepool, Nuclear Engineering International wall chart, 1969
 A selection of over a hundred images showing the building of the power station submitted by a local who worked at the site during its construction

Buildings and structures in the Borough of Hartlepool
Nuclear power stations using Advanced Gas-cooled Reactors
Power stations in North East England
1983 establishments in England
Nuclear power stations in England
Nuclear power stations with proposed reactors